From the first United States Congress in 1789 through the 116th Congress in 2020, 162 African Americans served in Congress. Meanwhile, the total number of all individuals who have served in Congress over that period is 12,348. Between 1789 and 2020, 152 have served in the House of Representatives, 9 have served in the Senate, and 1 has served in both chambers.  Voting members have totaled 156, with 6 serving as delegates.  Party membership has been, 131 Democrats, and 31 Republicans.  While 13 members founded the Congressional Black Caucus in 1971 during the 92nd Congress, in the 116th Congress (2019-2020), 56 served, with 54 Democrats and 2 Republicans (total seats are 535, plus 6 delegates). 

By the time of the first edition of the House sponsored book, Black Americans in Congress, in the bicentennial year of 1976, 45 African Americans had served in Congress throughout history; that rose to 66 by the 2nd edition in 1990, and there were further sustained increases in both the 2008 and 2018 editions.  The first African American to serve was Senator Hiram Revels in 1870.  The first to chair a congressional committee was Representative William L. Dawson in 1949.  The first woman was Representative Shirley Chisholm in 1968, and the first to become Dean of the House was John Conyers in 2015.  One member, then Senator Barack Obama, went from the Senate to President of the United States in 2009.  
 
The first African Americans to serve in the Congress were Republicans elected during the Reconstruction Era. After the 13th and 14th Amendments granted freedom and citizenship to enslaved people, freedmen gained political representation in the Southern United States for the first time. In response to the growing numbers of Black statesmen and politicians, White Democrats turned to violence and intimidation to regain their political power. 

By the presidential election of 1876, only three state legislatures were not controlled by whites. The Compromise of 1877 completed the period of Redemption by white Southerners, with the withdrawal of federal troops from the South. State legislatures began to pass Jim Crow laws to establish racial segregation and restrict labor rights, movement, and organizing by black people. They passed some laws to restrict voter registration, aimed at suppressing the black vote.  From 1890 to 1908, state legislatures in the South essentially disfranchised most black people and many poor white people from voting by passing new constitutions or amendments or other laws related to more restrictive electoral and voter registration and electoral rules.  As a result of the Civil Rights Movement, the U.S. Congress passed laws in the mid-1960s to end segregation and enforce constitutional civil rights and voting rights.

As Republicans accommodated the end of Reconstruction becoming more ambiguous on civil rights and with the rise of the Republican lily-white movement, African Americans began shifting away from the Republican Party. During two waves of massive migration within the United States in the first half of the 20th century, more than six million African Americans moved from the South to Northeastern, Midwestern, and Western industrial cities, with five million migrating from 1940 to 1970. Some were elected to federal political office from these new locations, and most were elected as Democrats. During the Great Depression, many black voters switched allegiances from the Republican Party to the Democratic Party, in support of the New Deal economic, social network, and work policies of Franklin D. Roosevelt's administration. This trend continued through the 1960s civil rights legislation, when voting rights returned to the South, to present.

History of black representation

Reconstruction and Redemption

The right of black people to vote and to serve in the United States Congress was established after the Civil War by amendments to the Constitution. The Thirteenth Amendment (ratified December 6, 1865), abolished slavery. The Fourteenth Amendment (ratified July 9, 1868) made all people born or naturalized in the United States citizens. The Fifteenth Amendment (ratified February 3, 1870) forbade the denial or abridgment of the right to vote on account of race, color, or previous condition of servitude, and gave Congress the power to enforce the law by appropriate legislation.

The first Black person to address Congress was Henry Highland Garnet, in 1865, on occasion of the passage of the Thirteenth Amendment.

In 1866, Congress passed the Civil Rights Act and the four Reconstruction Acts, which dissolved all governments in the former Confederate states with the exception of Tennessee. It divided the South into five military districts, where the military through the Freedmen's Bureau helped protect the rights and safety of newly freed black people. The act required that the former Confederate states ratify their constitutions conferring citizenship rights on black people or forfeit their representation in Congress.

As a result of these measures, black people acquired the right to vote across the Southern states. In several states (notably Mississippi and South Carolina), black people were the majority of the population. By forming coalitions with pro-Union white people, Republicans took control of the state legislatures. At the time, state legislatures elected the members of the US Senate. During Reconstruction, only the state legislature of Mississippi elected any black senators. On February 25, 1870, Hiram Rhodes Revels was seated as the first black member of the Senate, while Blanche Bruce, also of Mississippi, seated in 1875, was the second. Revels was the first black member of the Congress overall.

Black people were a majority of the population in many congressional districts across the South. In 1870, Joseph Rainey of South Carolina was elected to the U.S. House of Representatives, becoming the first directly elected black member of Congress to be seated. Black people were elected to national office also from Alabama, Florida, Georgia, Louisiana, Mississippi, North Carolina, Texas and Virginia.

All of these Reconstruction era black senators and representatives were members of the Republican Party. The Republicans represented the party of Abraham Lincoln and of emancipation. The Democrats represented the party of planters, slavery and secession.

From 1868, Southern elections were accompanied by increasing violence, especially in Louisiana, Mississippi and the Carolinas, in an effort by Democrats to suppress black voting and regain power. In the mid-1870s, paramilitary groups such as the White League and Red Shirts worked openly to turn Republicans out of office and intimidate black people from voting. This followed the earlier years of secret vigilante action by the Ku Klux Klan against freedmen and allied white people.

After the disputed Presidential election of 1876 between Democratic Samuel J. Tilden, governor of New York, and Republican Rutherford B. Hayes, governor of Ohio, a national agreement between Democratic and Republican factions was negotiated, resulting in the Compromise of 1877. Under the compromise, Democrats conceded the election to Hayes and promised to acknowledge the political rights of black people; Republicans agreed to withdraw federal troops from the South and promised to appropriate a portion of federal monies toward Southern projects.

Disenfranchisement
With the Southern states "redeemed", Democrats gradually regained control of Southern legislatures. They proceeded to restrict the rights of the majority of black people and many poor white people to vote by imposing new requirements for poll taxes, subjective literacy tests, more strict residency requirements and other elements difficult for laborers to satisfy.

By the 1880s, legislators increased restrictions on black voters through voter registration and election rules. In 1888 John Mercer Langston, president of Virginia State University at Petersburg, was elected to the U.S. Congress as the first African American from Virginia. He would also be the last for nearly a century, as the state passed a disenfranchising constitution at the turn of the century that excluded black people from politics for decades.

Starting with the Florida Constitution of 1885, white Democrats passed new constitutions in ten Southern states with provisions that restricted voter registration and forced hundreds of thousands of people from registration rolls. These changes effectively prevented most black people and many poor white people from voting. Many white people who were also illiterate were exempted from such requirements as literacy tests by such strategies as the grandfather clause, basing eligibility on an ancestor's voting status as of 1866, for instance.

Southern state and local legislatures also passed Jim Crow laws that segregated transportation, public facilities, and daily life. Finally, racial violence in the form of lynchings and race riots increased in frequency, reaching a peak in the last decade of the 19th century.

The last black congressman elected from the South in the 19th century was George Henry White of North Carolina, elected in 1896 and re-elected in 1898. His term expired in 1901, the same year that William McKinley, who was the last president to have fought in the Civil War, died. No black people served in Congress for the next 28 years, and none represented any Southern state for the next 72 years.

The modern era

From 1910 to 1940, the Great Migration of Black people from the rural South to Northern cities such as New York, Philadelphia, Chicago, Detroit, and Cleveland began to produce black-majority Congressional districts in the North. In the North, Black people could exercise their right to vote. In the two waves of the Great Migration through 1970, more than six and a half million black people moved north and west and became highly urbanized.

In 1928, Oscar De Priest won the 1st Congressional District of Illinois (the South Side of Chicago) as a Republican, becoming the first black congressman of the modern era. Arthur Wergs Mitchell became the first African-American Democrat elected to Congress, part of the New Deal Coalition, when he replaced De Priest in 1935.  De Priest, Mitchell and their successor, William Dawson, were the only African Americans in Congress up to the mid-1940s, when additional black Democrats began to be elected in Northern cities.  Dawson became the first African American in history to chair a congressional committee in 1949. De Priest was the last African-American Republican elected to the House for 58 years, until Gary Franks was elected to represent Connecticut's 5th in 1990. Franks was joined by J.C. Watts in 1994 but lost his bid for reelection two years later. After Watts retired in 2002, the House had no black Republicans until 2010, with the elections of Allen West in Florida's 22nd and Tim Scott in South Carolina's 1st. West lost his reelection bid in 2012, while Scott resigned in January 2013 to accept appointment to the U.S. Senate. Two new black Republicans, Will Hurd of Texas's 23rd district and Mia Love of Utah's 4th district, were elected in 2014, with Love being the first ever black Republican woman to be elected to Congress. She lost reelection in 2018, leaving Hurd as the only black Republican member of the U.S. House. 

The election of President Franklin D. Roosevelt in 1932 led to a shift of black voting loyalties from Republican to Democrat, as Roosevelt's New Deal programs offered economic relief to people suffering from the Great Depression. From 1940 to 1970, nearly five million black Americans moved north and also west, especially to California, in the second wave of the Great Migration. By the mid-1960s, an overwhelming majority of black voters were Democrats, and most were voting in states outside the former Confederacy.

It was not until after passage by Congress of the Voting Rights Act of 1965, the result of years of effort on the part of African Americans and allies in the Civil Rights Movement, that black people within the Southern states recovered their ability to exercise their rights to vote and to live with full civil rights. Legal segregation ended. Accomplishing voter registration and redistricting to implement the sense of the law took more time.

On January 3, 1969, Shirley Chisholm was sworn as the nation's first African-American congresswoman. Two years later, she became one of the 13 founding members of the Congressional Black Caucus. 

Until 1992, most black House members were elected from inner-city districts in the North and West: New York City, Newark, New Jersey, Philadelphia, Baltimore, Chicago, Cleveland, Detroit, St. Louis and Los Angeles all elected at least one black member. Following the 1990 census, Congressional districts needed to be redrawn due to the population shifts of the country. Various federal court decisions resulted in states' creating districts to provide for some where the majority of the population were African Americans, rather than gerrymandering to exclude black majorities.

Historically, both parties have used gerrymandering to gain political advantage, by drawing districts to favor their own party. In this case, some districts were created to link widely separated black communities. As a result, several black Democratic members of the House were elected from new districts in Alabama, Florida, rural Georgia, rural Louisiana, North Carolina, South Carolina and Virginia for the first time since Reconstruction. Additional black-majority districts were also created in this way in California, Maryland and Texas, thus increasing the number of black-majority districts.

The creation of black-majority districts was a process supported by both parties. The Democrats saw it as a means of providing social justice, as well as connecting easily to black voters who had been voting Democratic for decades. The Republicans believed they gained by the change, as many of the Democratic voters were moved out of historically Republican-majority districts. By 2000, other demographic and cultural changes resulted in the Republican Party holding a majority of white-majority House districts.

Since the 1940s, when decades of the Great Migration resulted in millions of African Americans having migrated from the South, no state has had a majority of African-American residents. Nine African Americans have served in the Senate since the 1940s: Edward W. Brooke, a Republican from Massachusetts; Carol Moseley Braun, Barack Obama, and Roland Burris (appointed to fill a vacancy), all Democrats from Illinois; Tim Scott (initially appointed to fill a vacancy, but later elected), a Republican from South Carolina; Mo Cowan (appointed to fill a vacancy), a Democrat from Massachusetts; Cory Booker, a Democrat from New Jersey, Kamala Harris, a Democrat from California and Raphael Warnock a Democrat from Georgia.

List of African Americans in the United States Congress

United States Senate

United States House of Representatives

See also

 African-American officeholders in the United States, 1789–1866
 Black suffrage in the United States
 African-American women's suffrage movement
 Civil rights movement (1865–1896)
 Congressional Black Caucus
 List of African-American United States Cabinet members
 List of African-American U.S. state firsts
 List of first African-American mayors
 Negro Republican Party
Politics of the United States

Notes

References

 Bailey, Richard. Black Officeholders During the Reconstruction of Alabama, 1867–1878. New South Books, 2006. . Available from author.
Brown, Canter Jr. Florida's Black Public Officials, 1867–1924. Tuscaloosa: University of Alabama Press, 1998. 
 Clay, William L. Just Permanent Interests Black Americans in Congress, 1870–1991. Amistad Press, 1992. 
 Dray, Philip. Capitol Men the Epic Story of Reconstruction Through the Lives of the First Black Congressmen. Houghton Mifflin Co, 2008. 
 Foner, Eric. Freedom's Lawmakers: A Directory of Black Officeholders during Reconstruction. 1996. Revised. .
 Freedman, Eric. African Americans in Congress: A Documentary History. CQ Press, 2007. 
 Gill, LaVerne McCain. African American Women in Congress Forming and Transforming History. Rutgers University Press, 1997. 
 Hahn, Steven. A Nation Under Our Feet: Black Political Struggles in the Rural South From Slavery to the Great Migration. 2003. 
Haskins, James. Distinguished African American Political and Governmental Leaders. Phoenix, Arizona: Oryx Press, 1999. 
 Middleton, Stephen. Black Congressmen During Reconstruction : A Documentary Sourcebook. Westport, Conn.: Praeger, 2002. 
 Rabinowitz, Howard N. Southern Black Leaders of the Reconstruction Era. University of Illinois Press, 1982.

External links
African American Members of the United States Congress: 1870-2012 A 66-page history produced by the Congressional Research Service.
Black Americans in Congress, Office of the Clerk, U.S. House of Representatives
Black Americans in Congress, 1870-2007 C-SPAN video with Matt Wasniewski as the presenter. He discusses the history of African Americans in Congress since 1870 (164 minute in length).

 

History of African-American civil rights
Reconstruction Era
Lists of members of the United States Congress
Congress